This is a list of Military Crosses (MC) awards in the 1919 Birthday Honours.

The 1919 Birthday Honours were appointments by King George V to various orders and honours to reward and highlight good works by citizens of the British Empire. The appointments were made to celebrate the official birthday of The King, and were published in The London Gazette from 3 June to 12 August. The vast majority of the awards were related to the recently ended War, and were divided by military campaigns. A supplementary list of honours, retroactive to the King's birthday, was released in December 1919.

Military Cross (MC)
For valuable services rendered in connection with military operations in the Aden Peninsula — 
Lt. Charles Hodding, Indian Army (Aden Machine Gun Company)

For distinguished service in connection with military operations in the Balkans —
Lt. Thomas Howard Weldon Adams, Royal Field Artillery 
Temp Lt. John Reynolds Ashford, Surrey Yeomanry
Temp Capt. Henry Martindale Bamford, Royal Engineers
2nd Lt. Ernest Bancroft  East Lancashire Regiment
2nd Lt. Dingwall Latham Bateson, King's Royal Rifle Corps, attd. Gloucestershire Regiment
Lt. John James Bayley, Royal Garrison Artillery, Special Reserve
Temp Capt. Owen Albert Beaumont, Royal Army Medical Corps
Temp Capt. Robert K. Birnie  Royal Army Medical Corps
Lt. Cyril Ernest Burge, Yorkshire Light Infantry, Special Reserve, attd. South Lancashire Regiment
Temp Capt. Mansfield Horace James Cherry, Royal Field Artillery
Capt. Charles Clarke, Cameron Highlanders
Lt. James Ellis Rutherford Dam, Royal Field Artillery, Special Reserve
Temp Capt. Henry Montague Dayies, Welsh Regiment
Lt. Ernest George Dickens, Royal Field Artillery
Temp Capt. Robert Dickie, Royal Field Artillery
Lt. James Johnston Dunlop, Lothians and Border Horse
Temp Capt. Norman Eachus, Cheshire Regiment
Temp Lt. Walter Stuart Emerson, Suffolk Regiment
Capt. Richard Fitton, King's Royal Rifle Corps
Rev. Charles Stanley Fleet, Royal Army Chaplains' Department
Lt. William Fraser, Argyll and Sutherland Highlanders
Lt. Arthur Bertie Gay, Royal Field Artillery
Temp Capt. Benjamin Balfour de Witt Gibbs, Welsh Regiment
Lt. William John Goodman, Royal Garrison Artillery
Temp Lt. Ronald, Gray, Royal Field Artillery
Temp Lt. Percy Henry Hadida, Gloucestershire Regiment
Capt. Alfred Hastings St. George Haraersley, Shropshire Light Infantry
Temp Capt. Joseph Bastable Harris, South Wales Borderers
Capt. Allan Hartree, Royal Garrison Artillery
Lt. Albert Haw, Royal Field Artillery, Special Reserve
Capt. Arthur Hardie Hill, Royal Garrison Artillery
Temp Capt. Eric Carew Hudson, Machine Gun Corps
Capt. William Webb Humphreys, Duke of Cornwall's Light Infantry
Lt. Reginald Leyfield, Middlesex Regiment
Temp Lt. Andrew Logan, Royal Field Artillery
Lt. Montague Percy Lothian, Argyll and Sutherland Highlanders
Temp Capt. Wilfred Victor Macaskie  Royal Army Medical Corps
Capt. Alistair Cameron Macdonald, Royal Army Medical Corps, Special Reserve
Lt. Harold Miclntosh, Argyll and Sutherland Highlanders
Lt. Cedric Armyn Cecil May, Cheshire Regiment
Capt. Herbert Thomas Moore, Royal Garrison Artillery
Lt. Roger Morton, Cheshire Regiment
Temp Capt. David Roy Orr, Scottish Rifles
Temp Capt. Robert Elias Lloyd Owen, Royal Garrison Artillery
Temp Lt. Ronald William Parviii
Capt. Malcolm Currie Peake, Royal Lancaster Regiment
Temp Lt. Alec Peters
Capt. Herbert Phillips, Middlesex Regiment
Capt. Alexander Hastings Renny, Royal Scots
Temp Lt. Alfred Maurice Rex, Royal Field Artillery
Temp Lt. George Herbert Richmond, Shropshire Light Infantry
Capt. Harold Robert Herman Rouquette, Royal Garrison Artillery
Capt. Selby Shaw, Royal Garrison Artillery
Temp Capt. James Robert Fyfe Smith, Royal Field Artillery
Lt. John Henry Smith, Royal Garrison Artillery
Capt. George Foster Stedman, York and Lancaster Regiment 
Lt. John Francis Dawes Steedman, Royal Engineers
Temp Lt. Frederick Alexander Stephenson, South Wales Borderers
2nd Lt. Cyril Parker Stevens, Duke of Cornwall's Light Infantry
Temp Lt. John Samuel Stott  Argyll and Sutherland Highlanders
Lt. Edgar Aubrey Stringer, Hampshire Royal Garrison Artillery T.F
Temp Capt. William Edward Sunderland  Royal Field Artillery
Lt. Charles Copley Swift, Royal Engineers
Lt. Albert Thomas, Duke of Cornwall's Light Infantry
Temp Lt. Harry William Thomas, Machine Gun Corps
Lt. John Ernest Howard Tripp, Royal Garrison Artillery, Special Reserve
Lt. Leslie Francis Vick, Royal Field Artillery
Capt. Phillip Lovibond Villar, South Wales Borderers
Temp 2nd Lt. Frank Stockdale Walker, Cheshire Regiment
Temp Lt. Alfred Waters Wells, Machine Gun Corps
Temp 2nd Lt. John Samuel White  Royal Engineers
Temp Lt. David Wilson, Royal Garrison Artillery
Temp Lt. Edwin Frank Woodsford, Royal Army Service Corps
Lt. Stanley Doubleday Wright, Derbyshire Yeomanry

For distinguished services rendered in connection with military operations in Eastern Russia —
Temp Capt. R. J. M'Alpane 

For distinguished service in connection with military operations in France and Flanders—
Temp Capt. Thomas Walter Adam, Royal Engineers
Temp Capt. Frederick Adams, Suffolk Regiment
Temp Capt. Edward Homfray Addenbrooke, Gloucestershire Regiment
Temp Lt. Frank Charles Ager, Liverpool Regiment
Lt. Ernest Edward Ainsley, Royal Horse Artillery
Lt. James Todd Allardice, Royal Highlanders
Lt. Ronald Edward Taylor Allen, Royal Field Artillery
Temp Lt. Andrew Miller Anderson, Royal Irish Rifles
2nd Lt. Charles Jamieson Anderson, Royal Garrison Artillery
Temp Regimental Sergeant Maj. Hugh Anderson, Army Cyclist Corps
Lt. Roderick Andrew Anderson, Scottish Rifles
Lt. Thomas Anderson, Royal Garrison Artillery
Temp Capt. William Anderson, Royal Army Veterinary Corps
Lt. William Balfour Anderson, Highland Light Infantry
Capt. Kenneth Forsyth Angus, Royal Garrison Artillery
Lt. Seymour Willoughby Anketell-Jones, Royal Garrison Artillery
Capt. Hesleytyne Oswals Charlton Anne, Royal Field Artillery
Lt. John Heap Appleton, 4th Res. of Cav
2nd Lt. Cuthbert Alphonse Arnold, Royal Garrison Artillery
Temp Lt. Cecil Rhodes Arnott. Machine Gun Corps
Lt. Frederick William Ashard, Seaforth Highlanders
Capt. Howard Dudley Ashby, Royal Garrison Artillery
Temp Lt. Robert Leslie Ashcroft, Royal Lancaster Regiment
Lt. Reginald St. George Atchley, Royal Field Artillery
Capt. John Smallshaw Atherton, Royal Army Service Corps
Temp Lt. George Nelson William Atkinson, Machine Gun Corps
Temp Capt. Herbert Atkinson, Northumberland Fusiliers
Temp Lt. Alfred Jubus Auret, Royal Engineers
Temp 2nd Lt. Janes Arthur Ayles, Royal Engineers
Lt. Elliott Glasspool Baker, Dorsetshire Regiment
Temp Lt. Reginald James Baker, Royal Fusiliers
Lt. Christopher Lucy Baldwin, Royal Artillery
Lt. Thomas Oscar Balk, Royal Engineers
2nd Lt. George Bannell, Royal Sussex Regiment
Lt. Arthur Digby Banting, Royal Garrison Artillery
Temp Capt. Arthur Stapleton Barker, Duke of Cornwall's Light Infantry
Lt. Frank Lewis Thornhill Barlow, Welsh Guards, attd. Machine Gun Regiment
Temp Lt. Leonard Barnes, Royal Field Artillery
Rev. Richard Langley Barnes, Royal Army Chaplains' Department
Lt. Bernard Maurice Barr, Royal Field Artillery
Lt. Frank Peace, Barrett, Yorkshire Dragoons
Lt. Henry Barrett, Royal Field Artillery
Lt. Randle Charles Barrington-Foote, Royal Field Artillery
2nd Lt. Roderick Barron, North Staffordshire Regiment
Temp Lt. Frederick William Bartholomew, Machine Gun Corps
Lt. David Hill Batchelor, Royal Scots
2nd Lt. Ronald Alec Bates, Royal Field Artillery
Temp Lt. Bertram Saxon Beale, Tank Corps
Capt. Hon Wentworth Henry Canning Beaumont, Machine Gun Regiment
Sergeant Maj. George Beck  Royal Warwickshire Regiment
Lt. Albert Caleb Beckett  Royal Engineers
Temp Lt. Alfred Ernest Beddow, Tank Corps
Lt. Alfred Bedford, Nottinghamshire and Derbyshire Regiment
Lt. Harold John Bednall, Royal Field Artillery
Lt. Norman Wendover Beeson, Royal Field Artillery
Rev. James Arthur Herbert Bell, Royal Army Chaplains' Department
Temp Lt. Francis Bell, Machine Gun Corps
Lt. Geoffrey Foxall Bell, Royal Field Artillery
Lt. Montague Bellamy, Royal Garrison Artillery
Lt. Eric Norman Wood Bennett, Royal Field Artillery
Lt. George Guy Marsland Bennett, Royal Irish Rifles, and Machine Gun Corps
Lt. Stanley Joseph Docking Berger, Nottinghamshire and Derbyshire Regiment
2nd Lt. Leonard Williams Bethell, Royal Field Artillery
Lt. Reginald Norton Betts, Liverpool Regiment
Lt. Andrew Wheldon Biles, Royal Engineers
Lt. Edward Arnold Binney, Royal Field Artillery
Temp Lt., Hay Ellerton Binns, Royal Engineers
Lt. Albert Harold Birch, Royal Field Artillery
Lt. William Reginald Birch, 1st Dragoons
Lt. Oliver Bird, Welsh Guards
Lt. William Birnie, Seaforth Highlanders
Capt. George Hitchcock Blake, Royal Army Service Corps attd. Rifle Brigade
Lt. William Edmund Roberts Blood, Royal Engineers
Temp Lt. Arthur Noel Bloor, Leicestershire Regiment
Temp Capt. Frederick Edward Vivian Blowen, South Wales Borderers, attd. Cheshire Regiment
Lt. Douglas Roper Blundell, London Regiment
Lt. Harold Bond, Royal Garrison Artillery
Temp Lt. Frank Thomas Foster Bone, Machine Gun Corps
Lt. Worship Booker, North Irish Horse
Lt. Francis Edward Henry Bostock, Royal Field Artillery
Temp Regimental Sergeant Maj. Herbert William Boulger, Royal Engineers
Lt. Richard West Bowen, Gloucestershire Regiment, attd. Devonshire Regiment
Temp Lt. Frank George Bower, Middlesex Regiment
Lt. Alexander Murray Bowman, Highland Light Infantry
Capt. Reginald Courtenay Boyle, West Somerset Yeomanry
2nd Lt. Donald Edward Brackenbury, Royal Field Artillery
Temp Lt. Harold Frank Brand, Royal Engineers
Lt. Reginald Briars, South Staffordshire Regiment
Lt. John Mindrum Briggs, Durham Light Infantry, and Machine Gun Corps
Temp Capt. Alfred John Brightwell, West Yorkshire Regiment
Temp Quartermaster and Capt. Harry Britton, Liverpool Regiment
Temp 2nd Lt. Gilbert Brooking, Royal Army Service Corps
Temp 2nd Lt. Leslie Dyker Brothers, Royal Army Service Corps
Lt. Laurence Broughton, Royal Garrison Artillery
Temp Lt. Charles Barrington Brown
2nd Lt. Cyril Brown, Royal Berkshire Regiment
Lt. Francis Maxwell Brown, Royal Garrison Artillery
Lt. James Brown, Royal Garrison Artillery
Lt. Kenneth Robert Brown Royal Garrison Artillery
Temp Lt. Robert Brown, Royal Engineers
Lt. Thomas Gilbert Brown, West Riding Regiment
Lt. Victor Frederick Browne, Royal Artillery
Lt. Jack Bertram Browning, Royal Engineers
Temp Capt. Robert Bruce, Royal Engineers
Lt. William George Buchanan, Royal Field Artillery
Temp Lt. Kenneth Dudley Bullpitt, Tank Corps
Temp Lt. Alec Burgess, Royal Engineers
Lt. William Bernard Burke, Royal Irish Rifles
Lt. William Patrick Burns, East Lancashire Regiment, attd. Tank Corps
Lt. Joseph Augustus Burnside, North Lancashire Regiment
Temp 2nd Lt. Cecil Burton, Royal Engineers
Quartermaster, and Capt. Noah Burton, Royal Lancaster Regiment
Lt. Wynne Colby Butcher, Royal Garrison Artillery
Lt. Leolin George Butler, Royal Engineers
Lt. Edward Reed Byas, North Staffordshire Regiment
Temp Capt. Thomas Geoffrey Caddick-Adams, Machine Gun Corps
Temp Lt. Geoffrey Charles, Caddy, Machine Gun Corps
2nd Lt. Henry Forbes Calder, Royal Highlanders
Capt. Oliver Reginald Caldwell, Royal Garrison Artillery
Lt. Robert Cameron, Royal Engineers
Temp Capt. Colin Bruce Campbell
Lt. John Charles Campbell, Royal Horse Artillery
Temp Lt. William Lamont Campbell, Royal Engineers
Lt. Miles Howell Canning, Royal Engineers
Lt. Frank Carpenter, Royal Field Artillery
Temp Lt. George Aaron Carr, King's Royal Rifle Corps
Temp Lt. James Carr, Motor Machine Gun Corps
Lt. Henry William Carter, Royal West Surrey Regiment
Temp Capt. Herbert Frederic Carter
Temp Capt. Robert Burnside Carter  Royal Army Medical Corps
Capt. John Cartland, Royal Warwickshire Regiment, attd. Royal Sussex Regiment
Temp Capt. Cecil Caradoc Carus-Wilson, Royal Marine Artillery
Lt. Carl Furness Casper, Royal Garrison Artillery
Capt. Godfrey Ernest Castle, Royal Field Artillery
Temp Lt. Joshua Rowe Cater, Royal Field Artillery
Capt. Wilmot Smyth Caufield, Leinster Regiment
Lt. Ronald Valentine Cecil Cavendish, Nottinghamshire and Derbyshire Regiment, attd. Argyll and Sutherland Highlanders
Capt. Harry Chambers, Royal Garrison Artillery
Lt. William George Chandler, Suffolk Regiment
Lt. George Chaney, Gloucestershire Regiment
Temp Lt. Francis Eglington Charter, Royal Field Artillery
Lt. Harold Edwin Cheeseman, Royal Field Artillery
Quartermaster and Capt. James Patrick Cherry, Durham Light Infantry
Temp Capt. Alexander Ian Chesney, attd. Intell. Corps
2nd Lt. Haydn Chester, Royal Garrison Artillery
2nd Lt. Percy Herbert Chinnery, Royal Field Artillery
Temp Lt. Pearson Choate, Middlesex Regiment
Temp Capt. Cyril Bayley Christopherson, Welsh Regiment
Rev. Noel Charles Christopherson, Royal Army Chaplains' Department
Capt. William King Churchhouse, Royal Army Medical Corps
Temp 2nd Lt. George Wilson Clark, East Yorkshire Regiment
Lt. Hudson Owen Clark, Royal Garrison Artillery
Temp Lt. Arthur Leslie Rimmer Clarke, Royal Engineers
Temp Lt. Edwin John Clarkson, Royal Engineers
Temp Lt. Alfred Maxwell Cleghorn, Royal Engineers
Lt. Charles Mathew Clode, Norfolk Regiment
Temp Capt. William Garnett Codling, Royal Engineers
Lt. William Melville Codrington, Royal Engineers
Lt. Walter Ashton Coker, Loyal North Lancashire Regiment
Rev. Charles Cole-Hamilton, Royal Army Chaplains' Department
Temp Capt. Howard Ebenezer Collier  Royal Army Medical Corps
Lt. Walter Collins, Gordon Highlanders
Lt. John Percy Colson  West Riding Regiment
Lt. James Douglas Conover, Royal Field Artillery
2nd Lt. Thomas Henry Constable  Loyal North Lancashire Regiment, attd. York and Lancaster Regiment
Temp 2nd Lt. John Stevens Cook, Royal Lancaster Regiment
Lt. Michael Edwin Cook, Royal Field Artillery
Lt. Reginald Valentine Travers Cooke, Devon Royal Garrison Artillery
Quartermaster and Lt. William Coombes  Machine Gun Corps
Temp Lt. Charles Ernest Tyrone Cooper, Seaforth Highlanders
Lt. Cyril Harrison Cooper, Northumberland Fusiliers
Temp 2nd Lt. John Alfred Guy Coote, Suffolk Regiment
Lt. Fiennes Wykeham Mann Cornwallis, 17th Lancers, Machine Gun Corps
Temp 2nd Lt. George Reginald Court, Tank Corps
Lt. Norman Cowell, Royal Garrison Artillery
Company Sergeant Maj. John Cowie, Royal Highlanders
2nd Lt. Samuel John Cox, Royal Garrison Artillery
Temp Lt. Edward Charles Coxwell, Worcestershire Regiment
Temp Capt. Walter Crabtree  Royal Army Medical Corps
Temp Lt. Archibald Campbell Craig
Capt. Henry David Cook Craig, Highland Light Infantry
Capt. Finlay Ross Cramb, Gordon Highlanders Royal Engineers
Lt. Gervase Watson Crawshaw, Manchester Regiment
Lt. Jack William Leslie Crawshay, Welsh Guards
Temp Capt. Walter Robert Creighton, Royal Army Service Corps
2nd Lt. George Herbert Critchley, Royal Horse Artillery
Lt. Charles Dymock Crofts, Royal Field Artillery
Capt. Thomas Grant Crosse, Royal Garrison Artillery
Capt. Guy Robert Crouch, Oxfordshire and Buckinghamshire Light Infantry, attd. Gloucestershire Regiment
Lt. Reginald Joe Calthrop Crowden, Lincolnshire Regiment
Lt. James Crowley, 5th Dragoon Guards
Lt. Richard Hunt Croydon, Royal Field Artillery
Lt. William Rowan Cruikshank, Royal Field Artillery
Lt. Alfred Frederick Morice Capel Cure, Royal Horse Artillery
Lt. Cyril William Daboorn, Royal Garrison Artillery
Quartermaster and Lt. William Dadd, Royal Warwickshire Regiment
Temp Lt. Thomas Daggar, Royal Engineers
Battery Sergeant Maj. Herbert Graham Dale, Royal Field Artillery
Lt. John Charles Dallas, Middlesex Regiment
Company Sergeant Maj. Henry Dalton, Argyll and Sutherland Highlanders
Rev. Eugene Daly, Royal Army Chaplains' Department, Royal Army Medical Corps
Lt. Basil Danells, Sussex Yeomanry, attd. Machine Gun Corps
Capt. Basil Derbyshire, Nottinghamshire and Derbyshire Regiment
Capt. John Conyers d'Arcy, Royal Field Artillery
Lt. Herbert Bruce Davidson, Royal Garrison Artillery
Lt. Evan Cyril Davies, Duke of Cornwall's Light Infantry
2nd Lt. Owen Parry Davies, Royal Garrison Artillery
Capt. Phillip Havelock, Royal Garrison Artillery
Lt., Reginald George Reynolds Davies, 16th Lancers, attd. Machine Gun Corps
Lt. Thomas Stanley Davis, Royal Field Artillery
Temp 2nd Lt. Robert William Davison, Royal Irish Rifles, attd. Royal Inniskilling Fusiliers
Lt. Ernest Philip Dawson, Royal Field Artillery
Temp 2nd Lt. Gilbert Buy, Royal Engineers
Temp Capt. Max Everard Delafield  Royal Army Medical Corps
Lt. Miles Christopher Dempsey, Royal Berkshire Regiment
Lt. Lionel Herbert Dermer, Royal Engineers
Company Lt. John Peter Fane de Salis, Royal Engineers
Capt. Peter Daniel Desbrow, Royal Garrison Artillery
Rev. Cecil Norman de Vine, Royal Army Chaplains' Department
Temp Lt. Robert Cyril Dewhurst
Lt. Algernon Newson Dickson, Royal Field Artillery
Capt. Thomas Cedric Harold Dickson, Royal Dublin Fusiliers, attd. Royal Inniskilling Fusiliers
Lt. Philip Kenelm Digiby-Jones, Royal Fusiliers
Temp Capt. Norman Margrave Dillon, Tank Corps
Temp Lt. Alfred-Benjamin Diplock, Lancashire Fusiliers
Lt. Alfred Chessington Dixon, Tank Corps
Lt. Gordon Stewart Dixon, Royal Field Artillery
Temp Lt. Hubert John Dixon, Royal Warwickshire Regiment
Lt. Reginald Crawshaw Dobson, Royal Garrison Artillery
Lt. Robert Dobson, Royal Lancaster Regiment
Lt. William Mansfield Dohson, Royal Garrison Artillery
Temp Lt. William-Mark Dodd, York and Lancaster Regiment
Company Sergeant Maj. James Donnelly  Durham Light Infantry
Temp Lt. James Downs, King's Own Yorkshire Light Infantry
Lt. John Edwin Doyle, Lincolnshire Regiment, attd. Tank Corps
Temp Capt. Joseph Stanislaus Doyle  Royal Army Medical Corps
Temp Lt. Douglas Laurel McCready Drew, Royal Garrison Artillery
Capt. Alexander Erskdne Drynan  Royal Army Medical Corps
Lt.-John Rowland Dudin, Royal Field Artillery
Lt. Arthur Paterson Duffes, Royal Garrison Artillery
Rev. Joseph Henry du Moulin-Browne, Royal Army Chaplains' Department
Lt. Leslie Duncan, London Regiment
Capt. Alfred Joseph Dunlop  Royal Army Medical Corps
Temp Lt. Douglas Hamilton Dunlop, Royal Engineers
Lt. John Donald Dunlop, Royal Scots Fusiliers
Temp Lt. Edward Bernard Dunn, Royal Engineers
Quartermaster and Capt. John Dunne, London Regiment
Capt. Alan Algernon Mario Durand, Royal Field Artillery
Temp Lt. Bernard Harry Durrant, Royal Engineers, attd. Machine Gun Corps
Temp Lt. Robert Edward Edwards, West Riding Regiment
Temp Capt. George Ernest Elkington  Royal Army Medical Corps
Temp Lt. Walter Parker Ellen, Royal Sussex Regiment
Capt. Noel Bayzand Ellington, Cheshire Regiment
Lt. Henry Ernest Elliott, Royal Garrison Artillery
Temp Capt. Cotiway Trevor Ellis, Royal Welsh Fusiliers
Lt. Samuel Gilbert Ellis, Royal Field Artillery
Temp Lt. Charles Frederick Elsey, Royal Berkshire Regiment
Lt., William Emslie, Gordon Highlanders, secd. Machine Gun Corps
Lt. Alfred James Enoch, Nottinghamshire and Derbyshire Regiment, attd. Tank Corps
Temp Lt. Hubert Etherington, Royal Garrison Artillery
Capt. Philip Eustace-Smith, Northumberland Hussars
2nd Lt. Edward Rees Evans, Royal Field Artillery
Temp Capt. Frederick William Evans
Rev. John Evans, Royal Army Chaplains' Department
Temp Lt. Owen Herbert Evaria, Machine Gun Corps
Temp Lt. William Arthur Evans, Royal Engineers
Lt. Charles Noble Fairburn, Royal Field Artillery
2nd Lt. Edward Faithorn, Royal Scots Fusiliers
Temp Capt. Gilbert John Farie  Royal Army Medical Corps
Lt. Harold Lister Farquhar, Coldstream Guards
Lt. Hamlyn George Faulkner, Machine Gun Corps
Temp Capt. Franklin Leonard Fay, Royal Engineers
Lt. Reginald Ernest Feiling, King Edward's Horse
Temp Lt. Alfred Leopold Felton, Royal Fusiliers
Lt. Thomas Frederick Fenn Royal Engineers
Capt. Joseph Henry Fenner, Royal Garrison Artillery
2nd Lt. Alexander Straughan Fenwick Royal Garrison Artillery
Lt. Alexander Wilson Ferguson, Royal Scots Fusiliers
Temp Lt. Hugh Ferguson, Royal Engineers
2nd Lt. Ian Ross Ferguson, Royal Garrison Artillery
Temp Lt. Thomas Dickson Ferguson, Royal Engineers
Capt. William Pike Ferguson  Royal Army Medical Corps
Capt. Frederick Denton Field, Royal Garrison Artillery
2nd Lt. Charles Findlay, Royal Garrison Artillery
Temp Lt. Douglas Herbert Fish, Royal Field Artillery
Lt. Harry Williams Fisher, Royal Field Artillery
Lt. Paull Fisher, Royal Engineers
Temp Lt. Herbert Flesher, Royal Engineers
Lt. Walter Leo Fletcher, Royal Field Artillery
Temp Lt. John Ernest Crawford Flitch, Royal Field Artillery
2nd Lt. Harold Walter Ford, attd. South Staffordshire Regiment
2nd Lt. Kenneth Jermyn Ford, Royal Field Artillery
Capt. Archibald Thomas Forman, Royal Field Artillery
Temp Lt. Robert Archibald Forrest, York and Lancaster Regiment
Lt. Gerald Forsyth, London Regiment
Lt. John Fowler, Royal Welsh Fusiliers
2nd Lt. Edward Charles Fox, East Lancashire Regiment, attd. Cheshire Regiment
Temp Capt. Henry Frampton, Somerset Light Infantry
Temp Lt. Angus Jeffrey Eraser, Tank Corps
Temp Lt. Charles Fraser, Manchester Regiment
Temp 2nd Lt. John Baird Fraser, Royal Lancaster Regiment
Capt. Robert CliffordFreeman, Royal Engineers
Temp 2nd Lt. John Thomas French, Royal Engineers
Temp Lt. John Laurence Fryers, Intell. Corps
Lt. David Fergus Fulton, Royal Engineers
Lt. Gordon Furze, Coldstream Guards
Lt. Norman Franklin Gadsdoit, Essex Regiment, secd. Machine Gun Corps
Temp 2nd Lt. Norman William Gallagher, Royal Engineers
Temp Capt. John Brady Galligan  Royal Army Medical Corps, attd. Royal Garrison Artillery
Lt. Robert Angus Galloway, Royal Engineers
Lt. Norman George Gane, Royal Scots Fusiliers
Temp Capt. Arthur James Gardiner, Royal Field Artillery
Capt. David Gould Gardiner  Royal Army Medical Corps, attd. Devonshire Regiment
Temp Lt. Hugh Gascoigne, Worcestershire Regiment
Lt. Neville Archibald Gass, Royal Horse Artillery
Lt. Charles de Lisle Gaussen, Royal Engineers
Lt. Alan John Gee, Royal Field Artillery
Temp Capt. Walter Hope George, Machine Gun Corps
Lt. George Howard Gibbs, Royal Dublin Fusiliers
Capt. Alexander Muir Gibson  Royal Army Medical Corps
2nd Lt. Francis Stuart Gibson, Royal Garrison Artillery, Special Reserve
Lt. James Forsyth Gibson, Royal Engineers
Lt. Ernest Gilbert, Worcestershire Regiment
Lt. Joseph Gill, West Yorkshire Regiment
Temp 2nd Lt. Minto Rodger Gillanders, Royal Engineers
Lt. Gordon Edward Charles Rowland Gilman, Royal Engineers
2nd Lt. Thomas Taylor Gilroy, West Riding Regiment
Lt. Frederick Glasgow, Gloucestershire Regiment
Lt. Augustin Munro Glen, Royal Field Artillery
Temp Lt. Arthur Stanley Glover, Royal Engineers
Lt. Malcolm Gibbs Goddaid, Royal Field Artillery
Temp Lt. William Coxy Goddard, Royal Engineers
Lt. Leslie Allison Godfree, Royal Field Artillery
Lt. John Wentworth Godley, Royal Field Artillery
Capt. Charles Eric Griffith Goodall, Lincolnshire Regiment
Lt. Anthony Trevor Gooding, Royal Field Artillery
2nd Lt. Frank Jenkins Goodliff, Royal Field Artillery
Temp 2nd Lt. Harold William Goodson, Bedfordshire Regiment, attd. Hertfordshire Regiment
Temp Capt. Herbert Crawford Gordon, Royal Inniskilling Fusiliers
Temp Capt. Thomas Gordon, Royal Army Veterinary Corps
Capt. Hubert Maurice Gorringe, Royal Engineers
Lt. George Gosnold, Royal Garrison Artillery
Temp Quartermaster and Capt. Joseph Goss, King's Own Scottish Borderers
Lt. Guy Francis Gough, Royal Irish Fusiliers
Lt. John Lockhart Gow, Honourable Artillery Company
2nd Lt. William Younger Gow, Royal Warwickshire Regiment
Temp Capt. Joseph Graham  Royal Army Medical Corps
2nd Lt. Alexander John Grant, Highland Light Infantry
Lt. William Albert Grasby, Machine Gun Corps
Lt. Henry Charles Green, Royal Field Artillery
Lt. Vincent Edward Green, North Staffordshire Regiment
Temp Lt. Bertram Thomas Greenwood, Royal Engineers
Capt. Harold Gustave Francis Greenwood, Royal Engineers
2nd Lt. March Greenwood, Royal Garrison Artillery
Lt. Percy Williams Greest, Royal Field Artillery
Lt. Thomas, Gregory, Royal Field Artillery
Lt. Norman Grey, Royal Field Artillery
Capt. William Arthur Grey-Wilson, Durham Light Infantry, attd. Machine Gun Corps
Temp 2nd Lt. Gwynne Griffith, Essex Regiment, attd. London Regiment
Lt. Ernest Cyril Griffiths, Royal Field Artillery
Temp Lt. Ivor Clifford Griffiths, Machine Gun Corps
Temp Capt. Alexander Sinclair Leslie Grove, Lincolnshire Regiment
Rev. Sidney Groves, Royal Army Chaplains' Department
2nd Lt. George Guest, Royal Engineers
Temp Lt. Michael Guthrie, Northumberland Fusiliers
Temp Capt. John Kenneth Gwinnell, Royal Fusiliers
Lt. Patrick Emmet Sarsfield Hackett, South Lancashire Regiment
Lt. Thomas William Dalby Hackett, Royal Field Artillery
Lt. Hubert Gordon Hague, Seaforth Highlanders
2nd Lt. James Haig, Royal Scots
Lt. Herbert Haithwaite, Royal Engineers
Temp 2nd Lt. Anthony Hall, York and Lancaster Regiment
Capt. Alner Wilson Hall, London Regiment
Lt. Lionel Reid Hall, Royal Scots
2nd Lt. William George Hall  Royal Field Artillery
2nd Lt. Peter Hamilton, Royal Field Artillery
Lt. William Percy Hamilton, Royal Field Artillery
Lt. Francis Aylmer Hamlet, Royal Dublin Fusiliers
Lt. Robert Geoffrey Hammond, Royal Field Artillery
Temp Lt. Henry David Hanbury, Royal Engineers
Capt. Reginald Henry Osgood Hanbury, 15th Hussars
Temp 2nd Lt. Ernest Thomas Gordon Hancock, Royal Garrison Artillery
Lt. George Augustus Hancock, Nottinghamshire and Derbyshire Regiment
Lt. Leonard Wyvill Hancock, Nottinghamshire and Derbyshire Regiment
Capt. Augustus Cameron Hancocks, Royal Field Artillery
Temp Capt. Thomas Milnes Harbottle, Royal Engineers
Capt. Arthur Geoffrey Pallison Hardwick, Royal Army Medical Corps
Capt. Bradford Hopewell Harper, Royal Engineers
Sergeant Maj. Alma Inkerman Harris, Loyal North Lancashire Regiment
Temp Capt. Richard Paget Harrison
Lt. John Barker Hartley, Royal Garrison Artillery
Temp Lt. Reginald Hartley, York and Lancaster Regiment
2nd Lt. Norman Leslie Hartridge, Royal Field Artillery
Temp Lt. John James Harwood, Lancashire Fusiliers
Temp Capt. Godfrey Sinclair Hasell, Royal Engineers
Lt. Charles Henry Hastings, King's Own Yorkshire Light Infantry
2nd Lt. Daniel Evans Havard, Royal Garrison Artillery
Lt. George Laurence Hawes, Royal Field Artillery
Lt. Bernard Gwynne Twyford-Hawkes, Worcestershire Regiment
Capt. Hervey Carleton Hawkins, Welsh Regiment attd. Liverpool Regiment
Capt. James Charles Edward Hay, Scottish Rifles
Lt. Richard Henry Percy Hayward, Royal Field Artillery
Sergeant Maj. Walter Headland, Bedfordshire Regiment
Capt. Thomas Lane Claypole Heald, Cheshire Regiment
Lt. Maurice Healy, Royal Dublin Fusiliers
Temp Regimental Sergeant Maj. Harry Heath, Worcestershire Regiment
Temp Lt. Oliver Heggs, East Lancashire Regiment
Temp Lt. Andrew Morris Henderson, Tank Corps
Capt. George Francis Henderson, Scottish Horse Yeomanry, attd. Cameron Highlanders
Temp Lt. James Liddell Henderson, Scottish Rifles, attd. Liverpool Regiment
Temp Capt. Henry Thomas Richard Hendin, Royal Welsh Fusiliers
Temp Capt. James Leith Hendry, Royal Army Medical Corps, attd. Royal Garrison Artillery
Lt. Charles Henning, Royal Field Artillery
Lt. Ian Mitchell Henry, Highland Light Infantry
Temp Lt. Ernest William Herbert, Royal Field Artillery
Lt. Evelyn Herbert, attd. Royal West Surrey Regiment
Temp 2nd Lt. David Wighton Herd, Tank Corps
Capt. James Roland Hewitt, Royal Field Artillery
Regimental Quartermaster Sergeant James Laurence Heyworth, Liverpool Regiment
Temp Capt. Cecil Barclay Hibbert, Machine Gun Corps
Capt. Julian Hickey, Royal Field Artillery
Lt. James Birchall Hide, Royal Garrison Artillery
Temp Lt. Frank Frederick Arnold Higgitt, Tank Corps
Temp Lt. Basil Benjamin Hill, Tank Corps
Temp Lt. Thomas Harry Hill, Worcestershire Regiment
Temp Capt. Arthur William Hills, Middlesex Regiment
Lt. Leslie Hills, Royal Field Artillery
Lt. Arthur Hinckley, Royal Garrison Artillery
Temp Lt. George Vernon Hinds, Royal West Kent Regiment attd. Royal Engineers
Lt. Frederick James Colquhoun Hindson, Royal Garrison Artillery
2nd Lt. Christopher Huntington Hird, Royal Engineers
Temp Capt. Herbert Henry Hiscocks, Tank Corps
Temp Lt. Christopher Gurney Hoare, Guards Machine Gun Regiment
Temp 2nd Lt. Edwin Salter Hoare, Royal Engineers
Temp 2nd Lt. Hubert Thomas Hockey  Wiltshire Regiment
Temp Capt. George Agincourt Hodges, Royal Army Medical Corps, attd. Tank Corps
Temp Capt. Geoffrey Walter Hodgkinson
Temp Lt. Phillip Sydney Hodgkinson, Tank Corps
Capt. Roger Thomas Alexander Hog, Royal Field Artillery
Temp Lt. George Langdon Hogbin, Royal Field Artillery
Lt. Thomas Alexander Hogg, Royal Field Artillery
Capt. Harold Roy Holcroft, Worcestershire Regiment
Temp Capt. Thomas Adamson Holden, Durham Light Infantry
Lt. Sidney James Holloway, London Regiment, attd. Lancashire Fusiliers
Temp Capt. William Bradley Holme, Liverpool Regiment
Sergeant Maj. Henry Holmes, Northamptonshire Regiment
Temp Capt. John David William Holmes, Royal Engineers
Capt. Jeffrey John Archer, Viscount Holmesdale, Coldstream Guards
Temp Capt. James Frederic Holt, Royal Engineers
Temp Capt. Vernon Harrison Holt, Royal Garrison Artillery
Lt. Gilbert Percivale Hoole, Royal Garrison Artillery
Temp Lt., Ernest Jack Hooper, Tank Corps
Lt. Harold Ridley Hooper, Suffolk Regiment
Lt. John Joseph Hooper, Royal Garrison Artillery
Lt. Keith Hanslip Hopkins, Rifle Brigade
Lt. Cyril Rupert Horley, Oxfordshire and Buckinghamshire Light Infantry
Lt. Bertram Percy Hornby, Royal Field Artillery
Quartermaster and Lt. William Wake Horsman, Nottinghamshire and Derbyshire Regiment
Temp Lt. Kenneth Charles Horton, Royal Engineers
Temp Capt. Gerald Vernon Hotblack
Lt. Ernest Frederick Housden, Royal Field Artillery
Capt. Algernon George Mowbray Frederick Howard, Duke of Lancaster's Own Yeomanry
Capt. Alfred Walpole Howard, Royal Inniskilling Fusiliers
Capt. Eric Spencer Gravely Howard, Royal Field Artillery
Company Sergeant Maj. Sidney Thomas Hubbard, Rifle Brigade
Temp Lt. Thomas William Hucker, King's Own Yorkshire Light Infantry
Lt. Cuthbert Lang Huggins, 3rd Hussars
Lt. Alfred Harcourt Hughes, Royal Field Artillery
Capt. Alfred Morgan Hughes, Royal Army Medical Corps
Temp Capt. Edward George Victor Hughes, Royal West Kent Regiment
Lt. George Leonard Hughes, Royal Garrison Artillery
Lt. Philip Charles Hughes, City of London Yeomanry, attd. London Regiment
Lt. Thomas Maughan Hume, Royal Field Artillery
Lt. Henry Humphreys, Royal Engineers
Lt. Leonard William Hunt, Somerset Light Infantry, attd. Lancashire Fusiliers
Temp Lt. Albert Richmond Hunter, late Northumberland Fusiliers
Rev. John Miller Hunter, Royal Army Chaplains' Department
2nd Lt. William Aldred Hunter, Royal Garrison Artillery
Lt. Robin Leslie Hutchins, Royal Horse Artillery
Lt. David Hutton, Gordon Highlanders, attd. 1st Battalion
Temp Lt. Percival Forbes Huttbn, Northumberland Fusiliers
Capt. Gervas Huxley, East Yorkshire Regiment, attd. Intell. Corps
Temp Capt. Claudius George Hyde, Royal Garrison Artillery
Temp Lt. Walter Ingham, Royal Engineers
Lt. Harold York Irwine, Royal Garrison Artillery
2nd Lt. Wilfred Lingard Jackson, Royal Garrison Artillery
Lt. Lionel Ernest Brooksby Jacob, London Regiment
2nd Lt. Leslie Harrison Jaques, Royal Field Artillery
Temp Lt. Arthur Jarvis, Gloucestershire Regiment
Capt. Franz Julius Jebens, Royal Fusiliers
Temp Lt. John Samuel Jerome, Royal Engineers
Lt. Charles Beckett Johnson, Liverpool Regiment
Temp Lt. Herbert Thomas Johnson, Royal Engineers
Lt. James Johnston, Highland Light Infantry
Capt. James Charles Johnstone, Devonshire Regiment, attd. Intell. Corps
Lt. Cyril Ernest Turner Jones, Royal Engineers
Temp Lt. Edgar Thomas Jones
Capt. Ion Mordecai Jones, Leinster Regiment, attd. Royal Inniskilling Fusiliers
Battery Sergeant Maj. James Harry Jones  Royal Horse Artillery
Temp Lt. Mervyn Vickers Jones, Royal Engineers
Capt. Thomas Kirkham Jones, Royal Engineers
Temp Lt. Thomas Lloyd Jones, Royal Welsh Fusiliers
Temp 2nd Lt. Sydney Juleff, Royal Engineers
Lt. Charles Robert Julian, Royal Garrison Artillery
Temp Lt. Andrew Kay, King's Own Scottish Borderers
Lt. Gerald Steinfeld Kaye, Royal Field Artillery
Lt. Edward Hugo Ohm Keates, King's Own Yorkshire Light Infantry
Lt. George Alexander Keay, Royal Field Artillery
2nd Lt. Eric Ernest Keen, Royal Garrison Artillery
Lt. Reginald Thomas Keenan, Royal Field Artillery
Temp 2nd Lt. Ernest Kelly, Machine Gun Corps
Lt. Maurice Henry Vaughan Kendall, Royal Warwickshire Regiment
Lt. Arthur Kennedy  Royal Army Medical Corps
Lt. Norman Dougall Kennedy, King's Own Scottish Borderers
Temp Capt. Frank Brown Kenny, Royal Engineers
Lt. Cuthbert Babington Kensington, Royal Garrison Artillery
Lt. Henry Vernon Kerr, Monmouthshire Regiment
2nd Lt. Arthur Edwin Pomeroy Kershaw, Royal Field Artillery
Capt. Geoffrey Goodier Kershaw, Manchester Regiment
Temp Lt. Thomas Garbutt Key, Royal Field Artillery
Temp Capt. Claude Gorringe Killick, Durham Light Infantry
Capt. Geoffrey Stuart King, West Somerset Yeomanry
Lt. Harold James King, Royal Garrison Artillery
Temp Lt. Peter King, Royal Engineers
Temp Lt. Joseph Julius Kino, Royal Field Artillery
Lt. Eric George Kirk, Royal Garrison Artillery
Temp Capt. Robert Closeburn Kirkpatrick, Royal Garrison Artillery
Lt. Alfred Frederick Kite, Royal Field Artillery
Temp Lt. Charles Henry Knight, Royal Sussex Regiment
Lt. Leonard James Knight, South Staffordshire Regiment
Capt. Vere Ronald Krohn, Royal Field Artillery
Capt. Eustace John Laine, Royal Army Veterinary Corps
Capt. Colin Moncrieff Laing, Northumberland Hussars Royal Artillery
Temp Lt. Arthur William Lambert, Northumberland Fusiliers
Lt. John Henry Graham Lang, Royal Field Artillery
Lt. Arthur Herbert Legh, Cheshire Regiment
Temp Capt. Edgar Couch Lemon, Royal Engineers
Lt. James Dawson Leslie, Gordon Highlanders
2nd Lt. Albert Edward Lewis, Royal Field Artillery
Lt. John Frederick Allen Lewis, Pembroke Yeomanry
Temp Lt. Thomas Charles Stephens Lewis, Army Cyclist Corps
Lt. Vivian Maurice Lewis, Welsh Regiment
Temp Capt. Percy Light, Cheshire Regiment
Lt. Robert John Liddle, Scottish Rifles
Temp Lt. Charles Crawford Lindsay, Royal Engineers
Temp Lt. Donald Septimus Lindsay, Machine Gun Corps
Lt. William James Lindsay-Forbes, Royal Field Artillery
Temp Capt. Henry James Linfoot
Temp Capt. Havelock Thomas Lippiat, Royal Army Medical Corps
Lt. Alexander Campbell Wishart Little, Royal Garrison Artillery
Temp Capt. Charles Mellis Lloyd
Lt. John Williatt Lloyd, Royal Engineers
Temp Capt. Stanley Lloyd
Lt. William Edward Lloyd, Royal Garrison Artillery
Temp Lt. Cyril Logan, Royal Inniskilling Fusiliers
Temp Capt. John Logan, Royal Scots, secd. Machine Gun Corps
Lt. Arthur George Thomas Lomer, Nottinghamshire and Derbyshire Regiment
Rev. Henry Hugh Lonnguet Longuet-Higgins, Royal Army Chaplains' Department
Temp Capt. Eric Gordon Loudoun-Shand
Lt. George Cecil Lowbridge, Royal Engineers
Temp 2nd Lt. Leonard Lowndes, Manchester Regiment, attd. Worcestershire Regiment
Temp Lt. Merrick Dunlop Lucas, Gloucestershire Regiment
Capt. John Noel Lumley, 13th Hussars
Temp Capt. William Lunn
Temp 2nd Lt. Robert Reid Lyle, Tank Corps
Rev. The Hon Charles Frederick Lyttelton, Royal Army Chaplains' Department
Temp Capt. David McDonald McAlister, Royal Field Artillery
Temp Capt. Douglas Robertson McBean
Temp Capt. John Bertram McCabe, Royal Army Medical Corps
Lt. Thomas Francis McDermott, Royal Garrison Artillery
Lt. Kenneth Mackenzie Macdonald, Royal Field Artillery
Temp Capt. Alexander James McDuff, Royal Field Artillery
Temp Capt. Roderic MacGill, Royal Army Medical Corps
Lt. George McGowan, Cheshire Regiment
Lt. John Charles McGrath, Royal Field Artillery
Rev. Archibald McHardy, Royal Army Chaplains' Department
Lt. Duncan McFarlane McIntosh, Royal Scots Fusiliers
Lt. William MacIntyre, Royal Highlanders, Welsh Regiment
Lt. William Bertram McIntyre, Royal Garrison Artillery
Lt. Wallace Rae McKaig, Liverpool Regiment
Lt. George McKay, Gordon Highlanders, attd. Machine Gun Corps
Sergeant Maj. Malcolm Mackay  Seaforth Highlanders
Temp Capt. William Ian McKeand
Lt. Ronald McKechnie, North Somerset Yeomanry
Capt. Thomas Barrington McKee  Royal Army Medical Corps
Temp Lt. Kenneth Alexander McKelvey, Machine Gun Corps
Capt. Hector David MacKenzie, Lovat's Scouts, Yeomanry
2nd Lt. Murdo Mackenzie  Seaforth Highlanders
Capt. Charles R. Mackintosh, attd. Royal Scots
Capt. William Patrick MacLaughlin, Royal Garrison Artillery
Temp 2nd Lt. Augustus McLoughlin, Machine Gun Corps
Temp Capt. John McMillan  Royal Army Medical Corps, attd. Tank Corps
Lt. Norman McMonnies, Seaforth Highlanders, attd. Royal Engineers
Capt. Hubert George McMullon, Royal Garrison Artillery
Lt. Douglas McNaughton, attd. Highland Light Infantry
Temp 2nd Lt. David Morrison McSwan, Royal Engineers, attd. Machine Gun Corps
Temp Capt. Ivan Robert Madge, Royal Garrison Artillery
Temp Capt. Duncan Malloch  Royal Army Medical Corps
2nd Lt. Charles Graham Mann, Royal Warwickshire Regiment
Lt. Douglas Bruce Upfield-Mann, Somerset Light Infantry
Lt. Nathaniel Mann, Royal Garrison Artillery
Capt. William Horace Mann, Royal Wiltshire Yeomanry
Lt. William-Henry Mares, Royal Engineers
Lt. Henry, David Reginald Margesson, 11th Hussars
Lt. Leonard David Marks, Royal Field Artillery
Capt. Arthur Thornthwaite Marsden, North Lancashire Regiment
Temp Lt. Alexander Marshall, Machine Gun Corps
Capt. Norman Marshall, East Yorkshire Regiment
Lt. Cyril Frederick Martin, Royal Garrison Artillery
Lt. Frederick George Stephen Martin, Northamptonshire Regiment
Lt. George Martin, Royal Garrison Artillery
Quartermaster and Lt. Robert. Martin, London Regiment
Lt. Thomas Fitzgerald Martin, Royal Field Artillery
Temp Capt. Thomas Mason, Royal Fusiliers
Capt. Charles Henri Masse, Royal Army Service Corps
Temp Capt. Allan Massey  Royal Army Medical Corps
Capt. Ralph Frederick Hugh Massy-Westropp, Royal Dublin Fusiliers
2nd Lt. John George Mathieson, Seaforth Highlanders
Capt. Peter Mathisen, Yorkshire Light Infantry, attd. Machine Gun Corps
Temp Lt. Henry Idris Matthews, Machine Gun Corps
Temp Capt. Richard FitzGerald Maurice, Tank Corps
Lt. Maxwell Sidney Harold Maxwell-Gumbleton, Royal Field Artillery
Lt. Edward Walter Nunn May, Royal Field Artillery
Lt. Harry May  Royal Field Artillery, attd Royal Engineers
Lt. Leopold Frederic May, North Staffordshire Regiment
Lt. John William Mayer, Royal Garrison Artillery
Temp Lt. Oscar Mayers, Royal Field Artillery
Temp Lt. Alfred Geoffrey Horace Mayhew, Royal Field Artillery
Temp Capt. Charles Fordred Mayosr, Northumberland Fusiliers
Lt. Charles Stanley Meadows, Royal Field Artillery
Capt. Herbert Meredith, North Staffordshire Regiment
Lt. James White Merryweather, Royal Engineers
Lt. Charles Edgar Metcalfe, Royal Field Artillery
Lt. Sydney Herbert Mews, Royal Field Artillery
Lt. Thomas Herbert Midgley, Royal Engineers
Lt. Harry Midwood, Royal Field Artillery
Capt. Bevis Lipscombe Miles, London Regiment
Lt. Charles Frederick Miles, Royal Field Artillery
Temp 2nd Lt. Alexander Stoddart Millar, Argyll and Sutherland Highlanders
Lt. Douglas Owen d'Elboux Miller, Royal Field Artillery
Lt. Euan Alfred Brews Miller, King's Royal Rifle Corps
Temp Quartermaster and Capt. Henry George Miller, Royal Army Medical Corps
Lt. James Miller, Royal Field Artillery
Lt. John Drummond Miller, Argyll and Sutherland Highlanders
Lt. William Adam Miller, King Edward's Horse
Lt. Archibald Cecil Mills, Devonshire Royal Garrison Artillery
Lt. Frederick Mills, Royal Scots, Machine Gun Corps
Lt. Arthur John Milne, Royal Field Artillery
Temp Lt. Charles William Milne, Royal Inniskilling Fusiliers
Temp Capt. Arthur Stanley Mitchell, Royal Engineers
2nd Lt. Leonard Hewitt Mitchell, Royal Garrison Artillery
Temp Capt. Ernest Bell Mollett, Middlesex Regiment
Lt. Walter Turner Monckton, Royal West Kent Regiment
Capt. David Frederick Money, London Regiment
Lt. Hugh Edmund Langton Montgomery, North Irish Horse
Capt. George Moody, Lincolnshire Regiment, attd. Machine Gun Corps
Lt. Juan Christian Moolman, Royal Field Artillery
Lt. Basil Gates Moore, Royal Field Artillery
2nd Lt. Ernest John Moore, Royal Garrison Artillery
Capt. Frank Leslie Morgan, Royal Warwickshire Regiment, attd. North Lancashire Regiment
Lt. George Brown Morgan, Royal Garrison Artillery
Lt. George Roderick Morgan, Royal Field Artillery
2nd Lt. Thomas Morgan, Royal Garrison Artillery
Temp Lt. Thomas William Morgan, Royal Field Artillery
Lt. Walter Vyvyan Lewis Morgan, Glamorgan Royal Garrison Artillery
Temp Lt. John Edward Modey, Essex Regiment
Temp 2nd Lt. Harold Arthur Morris, Royal Engineers
Lt. Walter Frederick Morris, Norfolk Regiment
Lt. Hubert Peter Morrison, Royal Field Artillery
Temp Lt. Stanley Fremantle Mort, Royal Engineers
Temp Capt. Wilfred Rowland Mount, Royal Engineers
Temp Lt. Erie Mackenzie Muncaster, Royal Engineers
Lt. Geoffrey Reginald Gilchrist Mure, Royal Horse Artillery
Lt. William Sydney Murland, 10th Hussars
Sergeant Maj. Albert James Murphy, Shropshire Light Infantry 
Lt. Patrick Murphy, Royal Irish Rifles
Lt. John Kidson Darby Musgrave, Royal Garrison Artillery
Lt. Patrick Ernest Neale, 2nd King Edward's Horse, attd. Machine Gun Corps
Temp 2nd Lt. Robert Nedll, Royal Army Service Corps
Lt. Harold George Nelson, Royal Garrison Artillery
Lt. Horace Claude Charles Newnham, Hampshire Regiment
Temp Capt. Cyril Mainwaring Newman, Lancashire Fusiliers
Lt. Frederick William Herbert Nicholas, Bedfordshire Regiment
Lt. Jonas Edward Nichols, Royal Field Artillery
Lt. Humphrey John Nicholson, 6th Dragoons
2nd Lt. Ernest Alfred North  Lancashire Fusiliers
Temp Lt. John Thomas Nuttall, Northumberland Fusiliers attd. Bedfordshire Regiment
Temp Capt. Charles Eric Gillespie Nye, Royal Engineers
Lt. Cyril Carrington O'Connor, Royal Garrison Artillery
Temp Capt. John Frederick Odell, Royal Engineers
Quartermaster and Capt. Edward O'Hanlon, Wiltshire Regiment
2nd Lt. William Robert Ollis, North Staffordshire Regiment
Temp Capt. Daniel MacLennan Oman, Highland Light Infantry
2nd Lt. Edward James Hobbs Orchard, Lancashire Fusiliers
Temp Lt. Frank Edward Orchard, Duke of Cornwall's Light Infantry
Lt. Simon-Dodd Ord, Essex Regiment
Lt. Herbert Orton, Royal Field Artillery
Lt. Richard Bourke Osborne, Grenadier Guards
Rev. Robert Vincent O'Shaughnessey, Royal Army Chaplains' Department
Capt. O'Donnell O'Sullivan  Royal Army Medical Corps, attd. Royal Warwickshire Regiment
Temp Capt. Stuart Oswald
Company Lt. Samuel Harrison Yardley Oulsnam, Royal Garrison Artillery
Lt. Arthur Reginald Page, Royal Engineers
Temp Capt. Humphrey Paget, North Lancashire Regiment
Lt. George Macaulay Painter, Suffolk Regiment, attd. Royal Engineers
2nd Lt. Frank William Paley  King's Royal Rifle Corps
Lt. Cyril Palmer, Essex Regiment, attd. Machine Gun Corps
Lt. Charles Edward Parker, Shropshire Light Infantry
Lt. Alexander Paterson, London Regiment
Temp Capt. William Lyle Paterson, Royal Army Medical Corps, attd. Royal Garrison Artillery
Capt. George Archibald Mackay Paxton, Essex Regiment
Lt. Henry Tayne, Royal Artillery
Lt. John Raphael Peacey, Royal Garrison Artillery
Lt. Walter Peake, East Kent Regiment
Temp Lt.William Henry Pearce, Royal Engineers
Temp Capt. Norman Robertson Pearson, Rifle Brigade
Temp Lt. William Pearson, Royal Irish Rifles
Lt. Edward Walter Peate, Royal Welsh Fusiliers
George Hugh Peckham, West Kent Yeomanry, attd. East Kent Regiment
Lt. Alfred Peirce, Royal Garrison Artillery
Lt. George Owen Peirce, Royal Field Artillery
Temp Lt. George Pellew, Royal Engineers
Lt. Geoffrey Harris Pemberton  Lancashire Fusiliers
Lt. George Brooks Penfold, Royal Field Artillery
Temp Capt. William Maxwell Penny  Royal Army Medical Corps
Lt., Edward Guy Pentreath, Royal Garrison Artillery
Quartermaster and Capt. Henry Joseph Percy  East Surrey Regiment, attd. Royal Fusiliers
Temp 2nd Lt. Isidoro Edmund Perez, Royal Engineers
Capt. Robey Thorpe Perry, Royal Guernsey Artillery
Lt. James Alexander Philips, Monmouthshire Regiment
Lt. i Thirlwell Philipson, Guards Machine Gun Regiment
Temp Lt. William Henry Phillips, Welsh Regiment
Temp Capt. Robert Wilson Picken, Royal Engineers
George Wimble Picot, Wiltshire Regiment
Lt. Arthur Vincent Piggott, 2nd King Edward's Horse
Temp Lt. Bevis Platt, Royal Engineers, attd. Royal Garrison Artillery
Lt. Benjamin Douglas Plummet, Northumberland Fusiliers, secd. Royal Engineers
Lt. Sydney Richard Pooock, Leinster Regiment, attd. Machine Gun Corps
Temp Lt. Geoffrey Kemp Podd, Royal Engineers
Lt. Herbert Pomeroy, Cheshire Regiment, attd. Labour Corps
Temp Lt. Robert Arthur Pomeroy, Labour Corps
Lt. Stephen Einar Gilbert Ponder, Royal Garrison Artillery
Lt. Edward Poole, City of London Yeomanry
Temp Lt. Edward Poole, Rifle Brigade, attd. London Regiment
Temp 2nd Lt. George Williams Poole, South Staffordshire Regiment
Quartermaster and Lt. Benjamin Pooley, Cambridgeshire Regiment
2nd Lt. Eliot Porter, Royal Field Artillery, Special Reserve
Lt. Joseph Pearson Postlethwaite, Royal Garrison Artillery
Lt. Harold Joseph Potts, London Regiment
Temp Capt. Thomas Pratt, West Yorkshire Regiment
Lt. Lawrance Caleb Pressland, Royal Garrison Artillery
Lt. Hugh Oliver Pring, Somerset Light Infantry
Lt. William Conradi Watt Pringle, Royal Field Artillery
Capt. Maurice Arthur Prismall, London Regiment
Lt. Inyr Roger Hilton Carwardine Probert, Royal Horse Artillery
Lt. Lancelot Eric Alan Prothero, East Kent Regiment
Lt. William Provost, Oxfordshire and Buckinghamshire Light Infantry
Capt. Edward Francis Mortimer Puxon, Nottinghamshire Yeomanry, attd. Nottinghamshire and Derbyshire Regiment
Lt. Herbert Garnet Wakeley Pye, Royal Field Artillery
Lt. John Pyle, Highland Light Infantry, and Machine Gun Corps
Sergeant Maj. Byron Edward Rabjohn, 20th Hussars
Lt. Victor Harry Raby, attd. London Regiment
Lt. Demetrius Ractivand, Shropshire Light Infantry
Lt. John Rae, Royal Engineers
Rev. David Randell, Royal Army Chaplains' Department, attd. Essex Regiment
Lt. Victor Rathbone, King Edward's Horse
Temp 2nd Lt. John Rawle, Middlesex Regiment
Sergeant Maj. John Rawlinson, 17th Lancers
Temp Capt. James Forrest Alexander Readman, Royal Engineers
Lt. Herbert William Reah, Royal Engineers
Lt. Wilfred Deuchar Reed, Royal Field Artillery
Lt. Emrys Francis Rees, Royal Field Artillery
Lt. Sidney Ernest Reeve, Royal Field Artillery
Temp Capt. Francis Warrack Reid, Highland Light Infantry
Capt. Leslie Cartwright Reid, Royal Engineers
Lt. Edward Frank Rendell, Royal Engineers
Temp Lt. Lancelot Edward Joshua Reynolds, Royal Engineers
2nd Lt. Vernon Frank Rhodes, Royal Field Artillery
Lt. Cecil Edwin Rice, Middlesex Regiment
Capt. Henry James Rice  Royal Army Medical Corps, attd. Liverpool Regiment
Quartermaster and Capt. George Richards, King's Royal Rifle Corps, attd. London Regiment
Lt. Robert Laddie Thomson Richardson, Royal Scots
Lt. Roland Edward Acril Richardson, Royal Garrison Artillery
Lt. Alexander Herbert Oliver Riddell, Bedfordshire Regiment
Lt. Fergus Harold Ridge, Royal Engineers
Lt. George Thomas Ridge, Somerset Light Infantry
Lt. John Douglas Ritchie, Gordon Highlanders
2nd Lt. Frederick William Rivett, Royal Garrison Artillery
Quartermaster and Capt. William Herbert Roberton, Durham Light Infantry
Lt., Edmund George Roberts, Royal Garrison Artillery
Lt. Owen Fiennes Temple Roberts, Royal Garrison Artillery
Capt. Reginald Geoffrey Roberts, 7th Dragoon Guards
Lt. Ian Sterphen Robertson, Seaforth Highlanders
Temp Capt. James Dewar Robertson  Royal Army Medical Corps, attd. Machine Gun Corps
Temp Capt. George Denis Burke Roche
Lt. Henry Colenso Hodda, Royal Engineers
Capt. Hubert Rodwell, Royal Army Service Corps
Lt. Hender Molesworth Rogers, Shropshire Light Infantry
Temp Lt. Lionel Rogers Durham Light Infantry
Lt. Claude Cecil Rose, London Regiment, secd. Machine Gun Co
Temp Capt. Leonard Roseveare, Royal Garrison Artillery
Capt. Charles Gordon Ross, London Regiment
Lt. James Frederick Stanley Ross, Royal Engineers
Temp Lt. James MacLarern Ross, Royal Engineers
Temp Lt. John Mowat Ross, Army Cyclist Corps
Temp Capt. Eric Walkden Rostern, Royal Engineers
Lt. Edgar Rotheray, Royal Field Artillery
Lt. Robert Row, Royal Engineers
Temp Lt. Herbert Vincent Rowlands  Royal Field Artillery
Temp Lt., Eric Royston, Royal Fusiliers
Lt. Leonard Merrick Budge, Worcestershire Regiment, attd. Royal Welsh Fusiliers
Lt. George Archer Busk, Royal Highlanders
Temp Capt. Alexander Russell, Royal Garrison Artillery
Temp Capt. John Kingsley Butter, Labour Corps
Temp Capt. George Ryder, Royal Engineers
Temp Lt. Charles Douglas St. Leger, Machine Gun Corps
Temp Capt. diaries Sadler, Manchester Regiment
Lt. Cyril Sebastian Salmon, Royal Irish Rifles, and Machine Gun Corps
Lt. Leonard James William Salmon, Suffolk Regiment
Lt. Edward Joseph Saltwell, Royal Field Artillery
Temp Capt. Arthur Hamilton Sampson, West Yorkshire Regiment
Lt. Eric Henry Lancelot-Sander, Middlesex Regiment
Capt. Benjamin John Meadows Sanders, Royal Garrison Artillery
Capt. John Forbes William Sandison  Royal Army Medical Corps
Temp Capt. Douglas Mill-Saunders, Bedfordshire Regiment
Lt. Kenneth Phillips Sawyer, Royal Field Artillery, attd. Royal Engineers
Lt. Harold Selwood Sawyer, South Lancashire Regiment
Temp Capt. Charles Edell Scott, King's Royal Rifle Corps
Lt. Duncan Scott, Royal Garrison Artillery
Capt. Francis Gerald Scott, Royal Field Artillery
Temp Lt., Robert Francis Cloete Scott, Lincolnshire Regiment
Capt. Sidney Scott  Royal Army Medical Corps
Lt. William Arthur Searle  Royal Field Artillery
Rev. Walter Sellers, Royal Army Chaplains' Department, attd Shropshire Light Infantry
Lt. Stanley Augustus Seys, London Regiment
Temp Lt. Alan James Shanks, Machine Gun Corps
Lt. Alexander Shanks, Argyll and Sutherland Highlanders, attd. Machine Gun Corps
Lt. Ronald Shapley, London Regiment
Capt. Philip Henry Sharpe, Royal Engineers
Capt. James Norrie Shaw, Royal Scots
Temp Surgeon-Lt. Reginald Kenworthy Shaw 
Lt. John Frederick Sheppard, Royal Field Artillery
Temp Lt. Gerald Ormsby Sherrard, Royal Garrison Artillery
Lt. Edmund Alfred Shipton, Cambridgeshire Regiment, attd. Royal Engineers
Lt. Cecil Douglas Shott, 2nd City of London Yeomanry, attd. Tank Corps
2nd Lt. Charles Ashley Shute  York and Lancaster Regiment 
Capt. William Richard Shutt, Royal Warwickshire Regiment
Capt. Ernest Frederick Malcolm Sim, Welsh Regiment
Temp Lt. Leonard Stephen Barrington Simeon, Royal Fusiliers
Capt. Frank Keith Simmons  Highland Light Infantry
Company Sergeant Maj. Hubert George Simons  Coldstream Guards
Temp Lt. Louis Arthur Skinner, Royal Engineers
Temp Lt. Percy Edward Slingo, Royal Engineers
Temp 2h d Lt. Alexander Small, Rifle Brigade
Capt. Richard Reginald Smart, North Irish Horse
Lt. Charles Smith, Cheshire Regiment
Temp 2nd Lt. George Alfred Smith, Tank Corps
Temp Lt. Harrison Churchill Smith, Royal Marine Light Infantry
Temp Lt. Norman Smith, Royal Engineers
Temp Lt. Robert Smith, Seaforth Highlanders
Capt. Thomas Cairns Smith, Scottish Rifles
Lt. William Leslie Winslow Smith, Royal Garrison Artillery
Temp Lt. Philip Harry Solomon, Royal Field Artillery
Lt. Raymond Thomas Somerville, Royal Lancaster Regiment
Lt. Charles Archibald Philip Southwell, Royal Garrison Artillery
Temp Lt. Edgar Ford, Spears, Royal Engineers
Temp Capt. Arthur Herbert Spicer  Royal Army Medical Corps
Lt. John James Hofer Spink, Royal Garrison Artillery
Lt. John Chailes Garth Spooner, Royal Field Artillery
2nd Lt. Leonard Spragg, Royal Garrison Artillery
Lt. JamesBaker Sproston, Royal Garrison Artillery
Lt. Arthur Stab, Royal Field Artillery
Lt. Percy Scott Stanbury, Northamptonshire Regiment
Lt. Edward James Standen, Lancashire Fusiliers
Lt. John Keith Stanford, Suffolk Regiment
Lt. Ronald Thomas Stanyforth, 17th Lancers
Lt. Walter Bayntun Starkey, North Somerset Yeomanry
Lt. John Morley Stebbings, Royal Field Artillery
Temp Capt. Frank Dunbar Steen, King's Royal Rifle Corps
Temp Capt. Frederick Geoffrey Roger Byng Stephens, Rifle Brigade
Lt. Warren Trestrail Stephens, Nottinghamshire and Derbyshire Regiment
Temp Lt. Arthur David Stephenson
Lt. Douglas Carter Stern, Royal West Kent Regiment, attd. 1st Battalion
Temp Capt. Rupert Donald Steward, Royal Field Artillery
Lt. Alexander Bremner Stewart, Royal Scots
Lt. James Allan St. Clair Stewart, Royal Field Artillery
Lt. William Hinton Stewart, Royal Garrison Artillery
Lt. Thomas Cyril Stirrup, York and Lancaster Regiment
Temp Capt. George Fuller Stone, Worcestershire Regiment
Capt. William Arthur Stone, Honourable Artillery Company
Lt. Frederick Stanley Straight, Oxfordshire and Buckinghamshire Light Infantry, secd. Royal Engineers
Capt. Gilbert Streeten, Royal Engineers, attd. Royal Engineers
Lt. Alexander Fulton Struthers, Scottish Rifles
Lt. George Murrell Stuart, Norfolk Regiment
Lt. Thomas Fisher Stubington, Royal Field Artillery
Lt. Thomas Sturrock, Royal Field Artillery
Capt. William Ridley Styles, 12th Lancers, attd. Machine Gun Corps
2nd Lt. Louis Frederick Summerfield, Royal Garrison Artillery
Lt. Francis Ian Sinclair Sutherland, Royal Scots
Lt. William Sutton, Durham Light Infantry, attd. Tank Corps
Lt. David Richard Swaine, Royal Garrison Artillery
Temp Lt. Charles Francis Swann, Machine Gun Corps
Lt. Arthur Clifford Swift, Royal Garrison Artillery
Sergeant Maj. Ernest Tabb  Devonshire Regiment
2nd Lt. Charles David Tabor  Royal Garrison Artillery
Temp Lt. John Scott Taggart, Royal Engineers
Temp Lt. Horace William Tamblyn, Royal Engineers
Temp Lt. George Aubrey Taplin, Royal Garrison Artillery
Temp Lt. James Tarbit, King's Royal Rifle Corps, attd. Somerset Light Infantry
Temp Lt. Arthur Charles Tarbutt, Royal Highlanders
Capt. Andrew Buxton Tawse, Royal Highlanders, secd. Tank Corps
Temp Lt. Albert Jenkins Taylor, Royal Engineers
Lt. Harold Taylor, Royal Engineers
Temp Capt. Montagu Wilbraham Taylor, East Surrey Regiment
Lt. Robert Allan Grant Taylor, Royal Scots Fusiliers
Capt. Stanley Taylor, Royal Field Artillery
Temp Lt. Sydney George Taylor, Royal Field Artillery
Quartermaster and Capt. William John Thexton, Welsh Regiment
Capt. Frederick Dunbar Thomas, Royal Field Artillery
Lt. Harold Thomas, South Staffordshire Regiment
2nd Lt. Gerald William Thompson, Royal Garrison Artillery
2nd Lt. Horace Albert Thompson  Royal Field Artillery
Temp Capt. Robert Howie Thomson, Royal Army Medical Corps
Lt. Edmund Basil Thornhill, Royal Field Artillery
Temp 2nd Lt.Thomas William Thurley, Manchester Regiment
Temp Lt. Alfred Cecil Timms, Essex Regiment
Lt. Montague William Tipler, Northamptonshire Regiment
Lt. George Herbert Norris Todd, Royal Horse Artillery
Company Sergeant Maj. John Charles Toogood, Royal Scots Fusiliers
Lt. John Lock Totterdell, 6th Dragoons, attd. Royal Engineers
Lt. George Cokt Totton, Northamptonshire Regiment
Temp Capt. Eric Morse Townsend, Royal Army Medical Corps
Lt. Bernard David Tracy, Royal Garrison Artillery
Temp Capt. John Cumberland Landalfl Train, Royal Engineers
Lt. Temp Capt. Denys Robert Trefusis, Royal Horse Guards
Temp 2nd Lt. Bernard Gaines Trevor, West Yorkshire Regiment, attd. King's Own Yorkshire Light Infantry
Lt. Wenzel Alfred Tuczek, Essex Yeomanry
Temp Capt. Henry William Turner, Royal Army Medical Corps
Capt. William Howell Turner, Royal Field Artillery
2nd Lt. George Alec Turney, Royal Field Artillery
Temp Lt. Fred Tye, Middlesex Regiment
Temp Capt. Vyvian Alfred Tylor, Machine Gun Corps
Temp 2nd Lt. Harold Alsonso Underhill, Royal Engineers
Lt. Reginald Harry Unwin, Royal Field Artillery
Temp Lt. Claude Cecil Valder, Royal Engineers
Lt. Ronald Visto Alexander Valentine, London Regiment
Lt. Ferdinand Jules Vambeck, South Irish Horse, attd. Army Cyclist Corps
Temp Lt. Henry Monckton Vatcher, Royal Engineers
Lt. Edward Ventham  Royal Garrison Artillery
Lt. Arthur Wadsworth, Middlesex Regiment
Lt. Charles Elvey Waite, Royal West Kent Regiment, attd. West Yorkshire Regiment
Temp Capt. Alfred Stewart Wakely, Royal Army Medical Corps
Capt. Cecil Edward Walker, Royal Garrison Artillery
Lt. Edward Walker, Royal Field Artillery
Lt. Berthon Ellerslie Wallace, Royal Garrison Artillery
Lt. John Charles Walton, Royal Garrison Artillery
Lt. Richard Warburton, Fife and Forfar Yeomanry, secd. Tank Corps
Lt. Francis Ward, Scots Guards
Temp Lt. Henry Wardall, Essex Regiment
2nd Lt. Thomas Zacharias Waters, Royal Garrison Artillery
Lt. James Anderson Scott Watson, Royal Field Artillery
Temp Lt. Norman Watson, Northumberland Fusiliers
Temp Capt. Cecil Victor Wattenbach, Royal Fusiliers
Capt. John Oscar Donald Way, R. Anglesey, Royal Engineers
Lt. Charles George Frederick Webb, Royal Artillery
Temp Capt. Stanley Augustus Webb, Royal Field Artillery
Lt. William Sidney Webster, Royal Field Artillery
Capt. Cecil McAlpine Weir, 7th Scottish Rifles, attd. Tank Corps
Temp Lt. Frank West, Devonshire Regiment
Lt. Frederick Sackville West, Royal Field Artillery, attd. Royal Engineers
Lt. Victor Reginald Westcott, Shropshire Light Infantry
Lt. Reginald White, Lincolnshire Regiment
Temp Capt. Richard Alfred Victor White, attd. Lancashire Fusiliers
2nd Lt. Jack Whitelock, East Yorkshire Regiment, attd. Lancashire Fusiliers
Temp Lt. Edward Whitley-Baker, Royal Engineers
Lt. George Whittle, Highland Light Infantry
Temp Capt. Francis Wilding, Royal Army Service Corps, attd. Tank Corps
Temp Lt. James Wilkie, North Lancashire Regiment, attd. East Lancashire Regiment 
Temp Quartermaster and Lt. Harry Wilkinson, Durham Light Infantry
Lt. Charles Gordon Williams, South Lancashire Regiment, secd. Royal Engineers
Lt. Frederick John Williams, Royal Inniskilling Fusiliers
Temp Lt. Henry Ronald Williams, Royal Field Artillery
Temp Lt. John Ernest Williams, Royal Welsh Fusiliers
Lt. Leslie Graeme Williams, Royal Garrison Artillery
Temp 2nd Lt. Thomas Williams, Welsh Regiment
Lt. George Harold Williamson, Nottinghamshire and Derbyshire Regiment
Capt. George Scott Williamson, Royal Army Medical Corps
Lt. Welburn Harry Williamson, Royal Field Artillery
Temp Lt. Raymond Wilmot, Royal Field Artillery
2nd Lt. Andrew Alexander Wilson, Cameron Highlanders
Lt. Charles Morell Wilson, Royal Army Ordnance Corps
Lt. Harold Edward Wilson, Liverpool Regiment
Capt. Tom Drummond Wilson, Royal Scots
Lt. Rudolph Winter, Royal Garrison Artillery
Temp 2nd Lt. Albert Witham, Welsh Regiment
Quartermaster and Capt. Joseph Withers  Leicestershire Regiment
Lt. John Calder Wood, Gordon Highlanders, attd. Royal Engineers
Lt. John Morton Devereux Wood, Royal Field Artillery
Lt. John Noel Wood, Royal Field Artillery
Lt. John Paterson Wood, Scottish Rifles, attd. South Staffordshire Regiment
Lt. William Stanley Wood, Royal Garrison Artillery
2nd Lt. AlbertEdward Woods, Northumberland Fusiliers
Lt. Leslie Woods, Royal Field Artillery
Capt. Geoffrey Harold Woolley  London Regiment
Lt. Christopher Pemberton Worsfold, Royal Engineers
Lt. Charles Wright, Royal Field Artillery
Rev. Norman-Macleod Wright, Royal Army Chaplains' Department
Lt. Thomas Lawrence Wright, Royal Garrison Artillery
Temp 2nd Lt. Walter-Anthony Wright, Machine Gun Corps
Lt. Geoffrey Noel Wykes, Leicestershire Regiment
Capt. Hon Everard Humphrey Wyndham, Guards, Machine Gun Regiment
Temp 2nd Lt. Frank Louis Youles, Labour Corps
Temp Lt. George Young, Machine Gun Corps
Lt. Gordon, Drummond Young, Royal Army Service Corps, attd. Royal Garrison Artillery
The Rev. William Paulin Young  Royal Army Chaplains' Department
Lt. Guy Bertram Yoxall, West Yorkshire Regiment
Temp Lt. Esme George Yung-Bateman, Royal Field Artillery

Canadian Forces
Capt. Arthur Claude Henry Andrews, Central Ontario Regiment
Rev. Hon Capt. William Robert Ramsay Armitage, Canadian Chaplains' Service
Capt. Arthur Baird, Canadian Engineers
Lt. William Louis Barrett-Lennard, Nova Scotia Regiment
Capt. Thomas Douglas Bennett, Canadian Army Medical Corps
Lt. Edward Alexander Bird, Canadian Garrison Artillery
Capt. John Black, Quebec Regiment
Capt. George Warsop Griffiths Booker, Canadian Engineers
Lt. John Lawther Bryant, Canadian Engineers
Lt. Charles H. Bunoe, British Columbia Regiment
Capt. James Burgoyne, Saskatchewan Regiment
Temp Capt. Frank Warren Burnham, Canadian Machine Gun Corps
Capt. Leslie Godwin Chance, Saskatchewan Regiment
Capt. Bernard Dysart Coombes, Manitoba Regiment
Lt. William John Cowan, Saskatchewan Regiment
Capt. Edward Herbert Daniel, British Columbia Regiment
Temp Lt. Vernon Russell Davies, Canadian Machine Gun Corps
Battery Sergeant Maj. Frank Elmer Dobson, Canadian Field Artillery
Capt. Hugh Percival Adams Edge, Central Ontario Regiment
Lt. Edwin Ronald Evans, Canadian Field Artillery
Temp Lt. Ralph Lindsay Feurt, Alberta Regiment
Lt. Robertson Fleet, Canadian Field Artillery
Capt. Walter Ross Flewin, British Columbia Regiment
Sergeant Maj. Frederick Gillingham  Princess Patricia's Canadian Light Infantry, Eastern Ontario Regiment
Quartermaster and Hon Capt. Arthur Grindell, British Columbia Regiment
Lt. David Adams Guildford, Canadian Garrison Artillery
Capt. Hector Clayton Hall, Canadian Army Medical Corps
Capt. Harry Ellis Hanwell, Canadian Railway Troops
Lt. Charles Ernest Henderson, Central Ontario Regiment
Capt. Harry Edwin Henderson, Canadian Machine Gun Corps
Lt. Harold Yeldersley Hicking, Saskatchewan Regiment
Lt. George Tweedie Inch, Canadian Field Artillery
Capt. George Irving, Fort Garry Horse
Lt. Glenn Harlan Keeler, Nova Scotia Regiment
Capt. John Kirkcaldy, Canadian Field Artillery
Lt. Herbert Cridge Laundy  Canadian Field Artillery
Capt. Stanley Alfred Lee, Fort Garry Horsey
Capt. Norman Lisle Le Sueur, Quebec Regiment
Lt. John Patrick MacCormac, Canadian Garrison Artillery
Lt. Donald McGillivray, Canadian Machine Gun Corps
Lt. Ellice Allan MacKenzie, Canadian Garrison Artillery
Capt. Allister Thompson MacLean, Canadian Engineers
Capt. Stanley Grover McSpadden, British Columbia Regiment
Capt. Irvine Meredith Marshall, Canadian Engineers
Capt. John Campbell Matheson, Alberta Regiment
Lt. Chester Henry Mathewson, Canadian Field Artillery
Capt. George Hamilton May, Canadian Army Service Corps
Capt. William Taylor May, Canadian Engineers
Lt. Arnott James Minnes, Canadian Field Artillery
Quartermaster and Hon Capt. Henry George Monger, Saskatchewan Regiment
Lt. Julian Impey Monteith, Central Ontario Regiment
Lt. Robert Arthur Seymour Nash, Canadian Field Artillery
Sergeant Maj. Ernest Nicholls  Eastern Ontario Regiment
Capt. Roy Nordheimer, Royal Canadian Dragoons
Lt. James O'Reilly, Canadian Div. Artillery
Sergeant Maj. James Page  Quebec Regiment
Temp Capt. Alfred Glynn Pearson  Princess Patricia's Canadian Light Infantry, Eastern Ontario Regiment
Capt. Francis Cyril Powell  Lord Strathcona's Horse
Capt. Frank Scammell, Central Ontario Regiment
Temp Capt. Almon Wilmot Scott, Alberta Regiment
Lt. Arthur Frederick Shaw, Canadian Engineers
Capt. Jesse Skinner, Canadian Machine Gun Corps
Capt. Percy Nash Amati Smith, Western Ontario Regiment
Capt. William Clegg Smith, Canadian Cyclist Battalion
Lt. James Matthias Snetsinger, Canadian Machine Gun Corps
Sergeant Maj. Sverre Sorenson, Canadian Field Artillery
Lt. Vernon Robert Spearing, Quebec Regiment
Lt. William Errol Boyd Starr, Canadian Garrison Artillery
Lt. Ray Alden Stewart, Quebec Regiment
Lt. Walter Margrave Taylor, Canadian Field Artillery
Capt. Philip Charles Tidy, C.M.R., Central Ontario Regiment
Capt. William Stephen Trenholme, Canadian Garrison Artillery
Capt. Ambert Hastie Veitch, Canadian Army Medical Corps
Lt. Richard Clampitt Vooght, Canadian Field Artillery
Lt. Clarence Victor Warner, New Brunswick Regiment
Lt. Frederick Herbert Wheatley  Canadian Machine Gun Corps
Lt. David Wilson, British Columbia Regiment
Capt. Robert Harold Wilson, Central Ontario Regiment
Capt. John Addie Wotherspoon, Saskatchewan Regiment
Lt. Charles Alexander Young, Canadian Machine Gun Corps

Australian Imperial Forces
Capt. Rupert Reid Agnew, Australian Infantry
Lt. Charles Reddie Allanson, Australian Infantry
Lt. Richard Vallance Andrewartha, Australian Infantry
Lt. John Robert Baird, Australian Infantry
Lt. Percy Ambrose Ballard, Australian Infantry
Lt. John AlfredBartels, Australian Infantry
Lt. Arthur James Beck, Australian Infantry
Capt. Diavid Henry Bodycomb, Australian Army Medical Corps
Capt. John Carlisle Bootle, Australian Infantry
Capt. James Pascoe Caddy, Australia Engineers
Lt. Donald Cameron, Australian Infantry
Lt. Thomas Wilson Cameron, Australian Infantry
Capt. Allan Campbell, Australian Infantry
Capt. Archie Sheridan Cockburn, Australian Army Medical Corps
Capt. Henry Samuel Cope, Australian Infantry
Lt. Charles Thomas Crispe, Australian Infantry
Lt. Norman Wilson Cuzens, Australian Infantry
Lt. Frederick James Deacon, Australia Engineers
Lt. George Frederick Seyler Donaldson, Australia Engineers
Lt. Harry Downes  Australian Infantry
Lt. Charles Robert Duke, Australian Infantry
Capt. Gordon Allan Dunbar, Australian Infantry
Lt. Frank Victor Whitefoot Duncan  2nd Australia Machine Gun Battalion
Capt. Stanley William Evers, Australian Infantry
Lt. Augustus Clive Berkeley Fitzhardinge, Australian Infantry
Capt. Daniel Arthur Fowler, Australian Field Artillery
Capt. Alexander John Fullerton-Andrew, Australian Field Artillery
Lt. Charles Wynyard Game, Australian Infantry
Capt. Robert Austen Goldrick, Australian Infantry
Lt. James Taylor Gray, Australia Engineers
Lt. William Harvey, Australian Infantry
Lt. William Warren Bowman Hogarth, Australian Field Artillery
Lt. John Dennison Howell, Australian Infantry
Lt. William Jackson, Australian Infantry
Lt. Nigel Travers Kingsmill, Australian Field Artillery
Lt. Frederick William MacGibbon, Australian Infantry
Lt. Charles Roy MacKenzie, Australia Engineers, attd Royal Engineers
Sergeant Maj. Hugh Mackenzie, Australian Infantry
Lt. Robert Walter Marriott, Australia Army Service Corps
Quartermaster and Capt. William May, Australian Infantry
Lt. William Douglas McDermid, A.M.G. Battalion
Lt. Clarence Frederick McDougall, Australian Infantry
Lt. Donald Lincoln McKenzie, Australian Infantry
Capt. Valentine Meates, Australian Field Artillery
Capt. Leslie George Merkel, 5th Australia Divisional Engineers
Lt. George Hedley Miller, 13th Australian Field Artillery Brigade
Lt. Harald Miller, Australian Infantry
Capt. Throsby Morell, Australian Field Artillery
Lt. Francis Arnold Moseley, Australian Imperial Force
Lt. Frank Peter Mountjoy, Australian Field Artillery
Capt. Frederick William Newth, Australian Infantry
Lt. Bryan Desmond O'Neil, Australian Field Artillery
Lt. Arthur Richard Pegler, Australian Machine Gun Battalion
Capt. Frederick George Phippard, Australia Engineers
Lt. Tom Malcolm Price, Australian Engineers
Lt. Herbert Guy Raymond, Australian Field Artillery
Lt. Oswald Garnet Reynolds, Australian Infantry
Lt. Lubin James Robertson, Australia Infantry
Lt. John Salter, Australian Infantry
Capt. Cyril Douglas Savage, Australian Infantry
Lt. Lancelot Beck Smith, Australian Infantry
Lt. Vernon Harcourt Henry Smith, Australian Machine Gun Battalion
Capt. Frank Noel Snow, Australian Field Artillery
Lt. Thomas Hamlet Taylor, Australian Infantry
Lt. Edwin Marsden Tooth, Australian Engineers
Lt. Percy Elgar Wand, Australian Engineers
Lt. Leslie Edward Watson, Australian Machine Gun Battalion
Lt. Anthony Claud Woolrych, Australian Imperial Force
Lt. Oscar Charles Zehnder, Australian Field Artillery

New Zealand Forces
Lt. John Sinclair Chisholm, Canterbury Regiment
2nd Lt. Philip Sidney Cousins, Auckland Regiment
Lt. Malcolm Keith Draffin, NZ Engineers
Capt. William Ellis Earnshaw, NZ Field Artillery
Lt. Edgar Beilby Edwards, NZ Rifle Brigade
Lt. James Walt Fraser, Canterbury Regiment
Capt. George Walter Horn, NZ Machine Gun
2nd Lt. Hohepa Jacob, NZ Maori Battalion
Lt. Gordon Cosgrove Laws, Wellington Regiment
Lt. Nairn Victor Le Petit, Auckland Regiment, attd. NZ Infantry Brigade
Lt. Kenneth John Mackenzie, Otago Regiment
Lt. Ernest Marsden, NZ Engineers, attd. Royal Engineers
Lt. Valentine Marshall, NZ Rifle Brigade
2nd Lt. Ernest Sydney Mayn, Otago Regiment
Lt. William Stewart Rae, NZ Engineers

South African Forces
Lt. Harry Bailey, SA Heavy Artillery
Lt. Alfred Scott Crooks, SA Infantry
Temp Lt. John Thorburn Humphrey, SA Infantry
Lt. Ernest Arthur John Maddison, SA Heavy Artillery
Temp Lt. Frank Whitmore Mellish, SA Horse Artillery
Sergeant Maj. George Meredith, SA Infantry
Temp Lt. Arthur Hirst Rushforth, SA Horse Artillery
Temp Capt. Walter Eric Thomas, Rhodesia Regiment, attd. King's Royal Rifle Corps
Lt. Herbert William Unwin, SA Horse Artillery

Newfoundland Forces
Temp Lt. Robert Allan Postlethwaite, Royal Newfoundland Regiment
Temp Capt. James Robins Stick, Royal Newfoundland Regiment
Temp Lt. Frederick Walter Waterman, Royal Newfoundland Regiment

For distinguished service in connection with military operations in Italy —
Temp Capt. Frederick Leonard Allan, Northumberland Fusiliers
Temp Lt. Frank Argles, Border Regiment
Capt. Laurence Ball  Royal Army Medical Corps, Royal Berkshire Regiment
Lt. Tom Irving Bond, Royal Field Artillery
Lt. Howard Gilbert Boulton, Worcestershire Regiment
Lt. Maurice Blumfield Brown, Honourable Artillery Company
Temp 2nd Lt. Charles William Buckwell, West Yorkshire Regiment
Lt. Harold Philip Bundy, Worcestershire Regiment
2nd Lt. John Ford Bygott, South Staffordshire Regiment
Temp Capt. Andrew Fulton Calderwood, Durham Light Infantry
Temp Lt. Cecil Varidepeer Clarke, South Staffordshire Regiment
Capt. James Bertram Coates, Royal West Surrey Regiment
Temp 2nd Lt. William Thomson Colville, Durham Light Infantry
Temp Capt. John Francis Conlin, Royal Field Artillery
Temp Quartermaster and Capt. Ernest Albert Cooper, West Yorkshire Regiment
Company Sergeant Maj. John Cooper, Royal Warwickshire Regiment
Capt. Henry Criswell, Royal Engineers
Lt. Alexander Pierre Darby, Essex Regiment
Temp Lt. Leonard Charles Dickens, Yorkshire Regiment
Lt. Keith Anstruther Duncan, Royal Field Artillery
Lt. Godfrey Lewis Trevor Eaton, South Staffordshire Regiment
Lt. James Edward England, Honourable Artillery Company
Lt. John Wood Fawdry, Royal Warwickshire Regiment
Lt. John Tabberer Fletcher, Royal Field Artillery
Company Sergeant Maj. Thomas Edward Fletcher  Border Regiment
Lt. Charles Tait Fortune, Royal Engineers
Lt. John Charles Blagdon Gamlen, Oxfordshire and Buckinghamshire Light Infantry
Lt. Charles James Gardner, Royal Field Artillery
2nd Lt. Sydney Wilson Gardner, York and Lancaster Regiment
2nd Lt. George Harold Garton, Royal Warwickshire Regiment
Lt. William Howard Green, Royal Lancaster Regiment
Sergeant Maj. Thomas Hannon  Royal Welsh Fusiliers
Lt. Robert Stafford Wrey Harding, Royal Field Artillery
Lt. Alfred Harrod, Royal Warwickshire Regiment
Temp 2nd Lt. Lawrence Hart, Yorkshire Regiment
Lt. Edwin Cowtan Hatton, Royal Welsh Fusiliers
Lt. James John Gilbert Hay, Gordon Highlanders
Lt. James Dennis Healey, Lincolnshire Regiment
Temp Lt. Christopher Douglas Hely-Hutchinson, Royal Artillery
Temp Capt. Reginald Lockyer Hibberdine, South Staffordshire Regiment
2nd Lt. Ernest Edward Howell, Oxfordshire and Buckinghamshire Light Infantry
Lt. George Joseph Somerset Hubbard, Dorsetshire Regiment
Temp Lt. David James, Machine Gun Corps
Lt. David Moy John, Royal Welsh Fusiliers, Special Reserve, attd. 1st Battalion
Lt. Harry Marshall Keen, Royal Sussex Yeomanry
Lt. Reginald Kerry, York and Lancaster Regiment
Lt. Kenneth Charles Warner Lacey, Royal 1st Devonshire Yeomanry
Capt. Frank Litchfield, Northamptonshire Yeomanry
Lt. Edward Mack, Essex Regiment, attd. Machine Gun Corps
Temp Capt. John Burnett Matthews, Royal Army Medical Corps, attd. Oxfordshire and Buckinghamshire Light Infantry
Temp Capt. James McLean McKnight, Royal Garrison Artillery, Indian Army
Lt. Alexander Gladstone McTurk  2nd Lovat's Scouts Yeomanry
Temp 2nd Lt. Ernest Edward Miller, Wiltshire Regiment
Rev. William Graham Moeran, Royal Army Chaplains' Department
Temp Lt. Arthur Orwin
Rev. Walter Mundell Paterson, Royal Army Chaplains' Department, attd. Gordon Highlanders
Rev. Arthur Gwilym Alfred Picton, Royal Army Chaplains' Department
Lt. Leiwis Greville Pocock, Royal Field Artillery
Temp Capt. Lionel John Treleaven Polgreen, Yorkshire Light Infantry
Lt. William John Hedley Pope, Gloucestershire Regiment
Temp Lt. James Clifford Ray, Northumberland Fusiliers
Temp Lt. John Robinson, Machine Gun Corps
Capt. Donald Gordon Romanis, Royal Garrison Artillery
2nd Lt. William Rugman, Royal Warwickshire Regiment
Lt. Paul James Sainsbury, West Riding Regiment
Lt. Alfred Julius Sington, Royal Field Artillery
Capt. Edward Montagu Cavendish, Lord Stanley, Grenadier Guards
Lt. Max Burgoyne Stone, Gloucestershire Regiment
Temp 2nd Lt. Edward Sydney, Machine Gun Corps
Lt. Joseph Tobin, Royal Field Artillery
Rev. Hugh Wilfrid Todd, Royal Army Chaplains' Department
Lt. William Arthur Todd, Royal Field Artillery
Lt. Charles Cogan Usher, King's Own Scottish Borderers
Capt. Maurice Charles Wade, Royal Warwickshire Regiment
Lt. Alan Leslie Wilson, Royal Engineers
Lt. James Young Wilson, Royal Field Artillery
Temp Quartermaster and Capt. Arthur Mayall Winder, Manchester Regiment
Lt. Robert Pearson Winter, Royal Engineers

For distinguished services rendered in connection with military operations in North Russia (Archangel Command) —
Lt. Adolphpe Beckerleg, Royal Engineers
Sergeant Maj. Harold Green Glögg, Liverpool Regiment
Lt. Joseph Hodgson, Liverpool Regiment
Capt. Humphrey Willis Chetwode Lloyd  Wiltshire Regiment
Rev. Rupert Joseph Roche, Royal Army Chaplains' Department
Capt. Rachard Graham Smerdon, Liverpool Regiment

Awarded a Bar to the Military Cross (MC*)

For distinguished service in connection with military operations in East Africa —
Temp Capt. Edward Andreas Priestland  King's African Rifles

For distinguished service in connection with military operations in France and Flanders—
Capt. David Dick Anderson  East Yorkshire Regiment
Lt. Norman Sandeman Bostock  South Staffordshire Regiment
Temp Capt. John Wilder Burdett  Leicestershire Regiment
Temp Capt. Charles Ellis Merriam Coubrough  Royal Garrison Artillery
2nd Lt. Augustus George Dickson  Royal Field Artillery
Lt. Charles Stanley Fisher  Royal Garrison Artillery
Temp Capt. Cecil Francis Tyssen Haigh  Royal Army Ordnance Corps
Temp Lt. Henry William Kernick  Royal Engineers
Temp Capt. Frank Horace-Liddell  
Capt. Henry Joseph Milligan  Royal Army Medical Corps
Lt. Harold John Mortimer  Royal Garrison Artillery
Lt. Edward Mount  Royal Engineers
Capt. William Maingay Ozanne  West Riding Regiment
Temp Capt. William McCutcheon Patrick  Royal Engineers
Capt. Alan Grant Richardson  Royal Engineers
Lt. Arthur Rought  Royal Engineers
Temp Capt. Alfred Henry Sayer 
Capt. Stuart Scrimgeour  Suffolk Regiment
Temp Capt. Eric H. Smythe  
Lt. Henry John Edwin Stinson  Royal Garrison Artillery
Lt. George Surtees  Manchester Regiment
Lt. James Frederick Tamblyn  East Surrey Regiment
Lt. Edward Maxwell Tyler  Royal Horse Artillery
Temp Capt. Charles William Vincent Webb 

Australian Imperial Forces
Capt. Charles Adrian Boccard  Intelligence Corps, Australian Imperial Force
Lt. George Hubert Wilkins  Australian Imperial Force

New Zealand Forces
Capt. Henry Delphus McHugh  NZ Cyclist Battalion

Awarded a Second Bar to the Military Cross (MC**)
For distinguished service in connection with military operations in France and Flanders—
Temp Capt. Francis Rainalt Abbott Granville  Royal Fusiliers

See also
1919 Birthday Honours - Full list of awards.

References

Birthday Honours
1919 awards
1919 in Australia
1919 in Canada
1919 in India
1919 in New Zealand
1919 in the United Kingdom
1919